Yanşaqbinə is a village in the Kalbajar District of Azerbaijan.

References 

Populated places in Kalbajar District